Passages North is an American literary magazine published by Northern Michigan University. Essays that have appeared in Passages North have been recognized in the anthology, The Best American Essays, on numerous occasions. The magazine was established in 1980. It sponsors the Waasmode Short Fiction Prize, the Elinor Benedict Poetry Prize, and the Thomas J. Hruska Memorial Nonfiction Prize.

Notable contributors 
Notable contributors are:
 Gina Ochsner (fiction)
 Moira Egan (poetry)
 Bob Hicok (poetry)
 Jacob Appel (nonfiction)
 Pamela McClure (poetry)
 John December (poetry)
 Robert Boswell (fiction)
Carolyn Kreiter-Foronda (poetry)

References

External links
 

Annual magazines published in the United States
Poetry magazines published in the United States
Magazines established in 1980
Magazines published in Michigan
Northern Michigan University